Al Salam Hospital or Hopital de la paix founded in 1996, is a private hospital located  in Tripoli, Lebanon and has a trauma center, an angiology unit with interventional radiology available, a stroke unit, a cardiovascular and abdominal vascular unit, a dermatology unit, a plastic surgery unit, a large burn center with laminar flow, a polysomnography unit and a new intensive care unit with laminar flow.

These services were added to the main services that the hospital provided, such as General Surgery, General Medicine, Obstetrics, Pediatrics, Critical Care, Laboratory, a Blood Bank, Hemodialysis, Chemotherapy, Physiotherapy, Radiology, scanners and ultrasound. The hospital has a capacity of 180 beds within its 10 floors.

in 2011, the hospital added other services 
Trauma Center with eight  emergency rooms. 
Hyperbaric Chamber
Dermatology unit and Plastic Surgery for early detection of skin tumors.
Burn center with five patient rooms laminar flow. The service has more than 18 dedicated patient rooms today with a complete second ICU unit also dedicated to the burn center and containing up to 12 more patient rooms.

in 2016, the hospital added a second ICU unit for the burn center. And also a Neonatal unit in order to respond to the population needs.

The hospital meet standards of Ministry of Health – Lebanon, ISO 9001.

See also
 List of hospitals in Lebanon

References

1996 establishments in Lebanon
Hospital buildings completed in 1996
Hospitals in Lebanon
Tripoli, Lebanon